Moon theory may refer to:

 Lunar theory, various theories to account for the Moon's motion
 Hollow Moon, that the Moon is a hollow sphere, including the hypothesis that the Moon is an alien spacecraft
 Moon landing conspiracy theories, various theories that Moon landings were faked